Cruchten is a small village in the commune of Nommern, in central Luxembourg.

Cruchten is served by a railway station.

Mersch (canton)
Towns in Luxembourg